Godefroy de La Tour d'Auvergne (Godefroy Charles Henri; 26 January 1728, Paris – 3 December 1792) was a member of the House of La Tour d'Auvergne, the Sovereign Dukes of Bouillon. He was subsequently the penultimate Duke of Bouillon succeeding his father in 1771.

Biography

The younger of two children, he was born to the Duke and Duchess of Bouillon in 1728. He had an older sister, Marie Louise (1725–1793) who later married the Prince of Guéméné.

Styled the Prince of Turenne as the heir apparent to Bouillon, he married Princess Louise Henriette Gabrielle de Lorraine on 27 November 1743. She was a member of the house of Lorraine and a great grand daughter of Henri, Count of Harcourt. The couple had four children in all before Louise Henriette Gabrielle died in 1788; three children pre-deceased them. The widower Duke married again in 1789 to Marie Françoise Henriette de Banastre (1775–1816), a girl who was some forty-seven years younger than he. No children were produced from the marriage.

He served with distinction in the Seven Years' War. In 1748 he was made a maréchal de camp. He was elected to the Royal Academy of Sculpture and Painting in 1777. In just three months, he squandered almost a million livres on his mistress, an opera singer, thus bringing his family to the verge of ruin.

He died at the Château de Navarre on the eve of Revolution and was succeeded by his eldest son Jacques, who was an invalid. Jacques was the last Duke of Bouillon, the title being abolished during the French Revolution. The Princes of Guéméné today claim the Duchy of Bouillon as their own due to the marriage of Marie Louise (his only sibling) and Jules de Rohan, Prince of Guéméné. He has no known descendants.

Gallery

Issue

Jacques Leopold Charles Godefroy de La Tour d'Auvergne (15 January 1746 – 7 February 1802) married Hedwig of Hesse-Rotenburg, grand daughter of Ernest Leopold of Hesse-Rotenburg and Eleonore of Löwenstein-Wertheim-Rochefort; no issue;
Charles Louis Godefroi de La Tour d'Auvergne, Prince of Auvergne (22 September 1749 – 23 October 1767) never married;
Louis Henri de La Tour d'Auvergne, Duke of Albret (20 February 1753 – 7 March 1753) died in infancy;
X de La Tour d'Auvergne (3 April 1756) stillborn daughter.

Ancestry

References and notes

1728 births
1792 deaths
Nobility from Paris
Godefroy
Military personnel from Paris
Dukes of Bouillon
Grand Chamberlains of France
People of Byzantine descent
18th-century peers of France
Dukes of Château-Thierry